Bangin'  is the second album by British rock band the Outfield, which yielded the top 40 hit, "Since You've Been Gone". The album also contained two other singles, "No Surrender" and "Bangin' on My Heart". "No Surrender" became a minor hit receiving MTV airplay and radio airplay in select markets. "Bangin' on My Heart" did not fare as well but did reach number 40 on the Billboard rock chart. The album was certified gold by the RIAA. The album serves as a follow to their 1985 album: Play Deep (1985)

Track listing
All songs were written by John Spinks except noted.               
"Somewhere in America" – 4:12
"Bangin' on My Heart" – 3:57
"No Surrender" – 4:47
"Moving Target" – 4:18
"Long Way Home" (John Spinks, Rick DiFonzo) – 4:22
"Playground" – 4:59
"Alone with You" – 3:17
"Main Attraction" – 3:54
"Better Than Nothing" – 4:04
"Since You've Been Gone" – 4:46

Personnel 
The Outfield
Tony Lewis – vocals, bass guitar
John Spinks – guitar, vocals
Alan Jackman – drums

Additional personnel
Frank Callaghan – additional vocals
Peter Wood – synthesizers on Track 7
The Filth Sisters – synthesizers on Track 3
Dee Long – synthesizer programming

References

External links 
 

The Outfield albums
1987 albums